The Hoosier Hundred is a USAC Silver Crown Series race scheduled for Lucas Oil Indianapolis Raceway Park as of 2023.  It is a revival of the original race held from 1953-2020 at the Indiana State Fairgrounds Speedway, a one-mile dirt oval in Indianapolis, Indiana. The race was first held in 1953, and through 1970 was part of the National Championship. 

Over the years, the Hoosier Hundred was considered one of the richest and most prestigious open-wheel races in the United States. Seven winners of the Hoosier Hundred have also won the Indianapolis 500, led by A. J. Foyt, who has won six times. Therefore, the Indiana State Fairgrounds Speedway was known as the "Track of Champions."

Qualifying and/or heat race(s) lead to the main event, originally 100 laps, 100 miles, but with the revival, will be 146 laps, 100.181 miles.

History
Racing at the fairgrounds oval dates back to the early 20th century. In June 1903, Barney Oldfield drove the first 60 mph (96.5 km/h) lap in automobile history at the circuit. The first AAA championship race took place in 1946, with Rex Mays sweeping the pole position and race.

1953–1970 – Champ Cars
The first Hoosier Hundred was held in 1953, and was part of the AAA National Championship Trail. The traditional date for the race would be in September. The race provided a popular second race in the Indianapolis-area, with the famous Indianapolis 500 in May, and many of the same participants returning to the fairgrounds four months later. The race grew in popularity and stature, and became one of the richest and most prestigious dirt track races in the U.S.

Starting in 1956, the sanctioning changed to USAC. It remained part of the "Champ Car" national championship trail through 1970. From 1965 to 1970, the Hoosier Grand Prix was held at Indianapolis Raceway Park, which meant there would be three Champ Car races in the Indianapolis area annually.

1971–1996 – Silver Crown cars
In 1971, USAC reorganized the National Championship trail, dropping all dirt tracks from the schedule. The Hoosier Hundred became part of the newly branded Silver Crown Series, and continued to maintain it popularity and stature. For most of the 1970s, several top drivers from the USAC Champ Car ranks would continue to participate.

Starting in 1981, a second sister race, the Hulman Hundred was added to the fairgrounds speedway. The Hulman Hundred, named in honor of Tony Hulman, was scheduled for May, typically the weekend of the Indy 500. Among the winners of the May race was future NASCAR champion Jeff Gordon.

In 1991, the Foyt Group took over promotions for both the Hulman Hundred (May) and Hoosier Hundred (September). For 1992–1995, they continued to schedule both races annually. For a brief time in the early 1990s, the Hoosier Hundred was moved up to Labor Day weekend, and coincided with the weekend of the U.S. Nationals, held at nearby Indianapolis Raceway Park.

The 1996 Hulman Hundred was held in May as scheduled, but during the summer of 1996, the traditional fall Hoosier Hundred was cancelled by the Foyt Group. They cited sagging attendance and revenue. In order to maintain a continuous lineage, the May 25 "Hulman Hundred" was retroactively titled the "1996 Hoosier Hundred."

1997–2001: Hulman-Hoosier Hundred
Starting in 1997, the Foyt Group merged the two races, and introduced a newly revamped event, titled the TrueValue Hulman-Hoosier Hundred. They elected to utilize the May date, expecting a better crowd the weekend of the Indy 500.

The 1998 race was notable in that three drivers in the Hulman-Hoosier Hundred, Donnie Beechler, Jimmy Kite, and Jack Hewitt, were also participating in the Indianapolis 500. It was the first time in several years that multiple drivers competed at the fairgrounds and at Indy in the same year. Beechler would go on to win the race (called at 39 miles due to rain), while Kite and Hewitt would finish 11th and 12th, respectively, at Indy.

In 2000, the race was rained out on Friday May 26 and Saturday May 27. The Foyt Group rescheduled the race for September 22, the Friday before the Formula One U.S. Grand Prix at Indy. The race temporarily returned to its traditional September date and took on the one-time moniker the "Salute to the Grand Prix."

In 2001, the race was rained out again. For the second year in a row, it was rescheduled for the Friday before the U.S. Grand Prix. After 2001, the Foyt Group quit promotion of the race, and it was temporarily put on hiatus.

2002-19: Revival
6R promotions took over the event, and revived the race for 2002. It was reverted to the original "Hoosier Hundred" name, dropping the "Hulman" reference. The race kept the Indy 500 weekend date in late May.

Track Enterprises and Bob Sargent took over the race in 2006 and currently promotes the race. For the 60th running in 2013, it was planned to move the race from Friday night of Indy 500 weekend to Thursday night. Carb Day, the final day of practice for the Indy 500, had been moved to Friday, and organizers wanted to move the Hoosier Hundred to avoid the conflict. However, in 2013, Thursday night was rained out, and the race was postponed to Friday night after all.

2020
Track Enterprises continues as the promoter of the event. In 2019, with the rise of horse racing and the push for more legalized sports betting, the Fairgrounds announced that the race track would down after the 2019 season and would be converted into a harness practice facility.

Track Enterprises announced on November 25, 2019 that the Hoosier Hundred would move to the Terre Haute Action Track, a half-mile dirt track also promoted by the company, beginning in 2020.  However, due to the COVID-19 pandemic, the 2020 Hoosier Hundred/Sumar Classic, scheduled for May 21, was initially scratched. Later in the year, the race was revived and rescheduled for the night of August 23 (the same day as the Indy 500), but back at the Fairgrounds track, as the planned improvements to convert the Fairgrounds oval to a horse racing facility were delayed. For the 2021 season, the Hoosier Hundred was replaced by the Sumar Classic at Terre Haute.

2023
The National Hot Rod Association, owner of Lucas Oil Indianapolis Raceway Park, and the United States Auto Club announced on October 21, 2022 that the Hoosier Hundred will return on April 23, 2023, on the .686 mile paved oval.  The race will be 146 laps on the .686 mile oval, and was formally placed in the 2023 USAC schedule as part of the Performance Racing Industry events in Indianapolis that includes the USAC prizegiving banquet.  The event will be a non-championship event, with drivers and teams earning appearance points only.

Race results

Hoosier Hundred

Hulman Hundred

Footnotes
1964: Scheduled for September 19; postponed to September 26 due to rain
1996: The annual Hulman Hundred was scheduled for Friday May 24, but was postponed until Saturday May 25 due to rain. The traditional fall race was scheduled for late August, but was ultimately cancelled by promoters. The May 25, 1996 running of the "Hulman Hundred" (won by Dave Darland) was retroactively designated the 1996 edition of the annual "Hoosier Hundred," and is henceforth considered part of its annual lineage.
2000: Scheduled for Friday May 26, postponed to September 22 due to rain and became part of U.S. Grand Prix weekend. 
2001: Scheduled for Friday May 25, postponed to September 28 due to rain and became part of U.S. Grand Prix weekend.
2013: Scheduled for Thursday May 23; postponed to Friday May 24 due to rain
2020: Scheduled for May 21 at Terre Haute Action Track but cancelled due to COVID-19 pandemic. Race was rescheduled for August 23 at the Fairgrounds.

Notes

See also
Hut Hundred
Little 500
Turkey Night Grand Prix
Carb Night Classic

Works cited
ChampCarStas.com - Indiana State Fairgrounds
RacingReference.info - Indiana State Fairgrounds
Ultimate Racing History - Indiana State Fairgrounds
List of race winners

References

External links
Hoosier Hundred - Official site
Indiana State Fair - Official site

Champ Car races
Motorsport in Indianapolis
Indiana State Fair